Marta Cantón Gutiérrez (born 28 December 1965 in Barcelona) is a retired Spanish rhythmic gymnast.

She competed for Spain in the rhythmic gymnastics all-around competition at the 1984 Summer Olympics in Los Angeles. She tied for third place in the qualification, advanced to the final and ended up in sixth place overall.

References

External links 
 

1965 births
Living people
Spanish rhythmic gymnasts
Gymnasts at the 1984 Summer Olympics
Olympic gymnasts of Spain
Gymnasts from Barcelona